Roopesh Kumar (16 January 1946 – 29 January 1995) was a character actor in Bollywood films, especially known for his role as a villain in over 100 Hindi films from 1965 to 1995. He is widely remembered for his comic negative roles in the films like Seeta Aur Geeta and The Great Gambler. He was the cousin of actress Mumtaz.

Personal life
Kumar was born in Mumbai as Abbas Farashahi. He was the oldest child of Ali Asgar Farashahi (Asgar Seth of Pune City, Mandai) and Mariam. He was a student of Dastur School in Pune. From his early childhood he was interested in acting. His family were in the restaurant and bakery business in Pune but he chose to be an actor. Kumar was fondly known as Dadash (meaning brother in Persian). He was very close to his cousins actress Mumtaz and Malika. His oldest daughter is married to Dilip Kumar's nephew Zahid Khan and they have two children.

On 29 January 1995, Kumar suffered a heart attack while attending an awards ceremony and was rushed to hospital. He died in the ambulance on the way to the hospital at the age of 49.

Career
He started his career with Tarzan and King Kong in 1965 and went on to play supporting roles of mostly villains throughout the 1970s and 1980s. His most well known films include Andaz (1971), Seeta Aur Geeta (1972), Chacha Bhatija (1977), The Great Gambler (1979), Jaani Dushman (1979), Hum Paanch (1980), Bade Dilwala (1983) and Guru (1989). He also produced and directed two films, Hai Meri Jaan (1991) and Meri Aan (1993). His last film release was Paappi Devataa in 1995, the same year of his death.

Selected filmography

 Rustom E Hind (1965)
 Main Wohi Hoon (1966) as Rajan
 Sapno Ka Saudagar (1968) as Kumar Pran Nath Singh 
 Aadmi Aur Insaan (1969) as Abdul Rashid 
 Jeene Ki Raah (1969) as Rasdas
 Sharafat (1970) as Arun
 Jeevan Mrityu (1970) as Sameer
 Kal Aaj Aur Kal (1971) as Sunny
 Andaz (1971) as Badal
 Raampur Ka Lakshman (1972) as Chhaganlal Pandey
 Seeta Aur Geeta (1972) as Ranjeet
 Loafer (1973) as Rakesh
 Prabhat (1973) as Ramesh
 Aashiana (1974)
 Insaaniyat (1974) as Girdharilal
 Paap Aur Punya (1974) as Tiger's Associate
 Zinda Dil (1975) as Ghanshyam Thakur
 Mere Sartaj (1975) as Asad
 Nagin (1976) as Meena's Husband
 Naach Uthe Sansaar (1976) as Johnny
Phir Janam Lenge Hum (1977) as Hamid 
Jay Vejay (1977) as King Diler S. Jung 
 Chacha Bhatija (1977) as Kiran
 Dildaar (1977) as Prasad
 Karm (1977) as Premnath
Kasam Khoon Ki (1977) as Sher Singh, Sharp Shooter
Doosra Aadmi (1977) as Rupesh
 Amar Deep (1979) as Ramesh
 Jaani Dushman (1979) as Shera's Uncle
 The Great Gambler (1979) as Sethi
 Lok Parlok (1979) as Hotel's Manager
 Choron Ki Baaraat (1980) as Jaggu
  Red Rose as Inspector Bhushan
 Hum Paanch (1980) as Vijay
 Guest House (1980) as Kantilal
 Do Premee (1980) as Suresh
 Insaan (1982 film)
Nishaan (1983) as Veeru
Souten (1983) as Bingo, photographer
Bade Dil Wala (1983) as Prem
Maati Maangey Khoon (1984)
Aasmaan (1984)
 Asha Jyoti (1984) as Hukumchand
Babu (1985 film) as Jaggu Dada
 Pyar Jhukta Nahin (1985) as Rohit Prasad
 Hum Dono (1985)
Preeti (1986 film)
 Muddat (1986) as Bhagwat Singh
 Insaaf Ki Awaaz (1986) as Mahendranath
Loha (1987) as Prisoner
Daku Hasina (1987) as Rana
Zakhmi Aurat(1988)
Kasam (1988) as Police Officer
 Sachai Ki Taqat (1989) as Rekha's Brother
 Daata (1989) as G. D.'s Employee
Guru (1989)
 Mujrim (1989) as Gulati
 Jurrat (1989) as Girdhar
Karishma Kali Kaa (1990) as Police Inspector Ganpat Godbole
Haar Jeet (1990 film)
 Pratigyabadh (1991) as Tej bahadur/Tejaa Henchman 
 Aa Gale Lag Jaa (1994) as Satish Khanna
Paappi Devataa (1994) as Kundan

Television

References

External links
 

1946 births
1995 deaths
Indian male film actors
Male actors in Hindi cinema
20th-century Indian male actors
Date of death unknown